Yu Thandar Yin (born 6 March 1991) is a Burmese actress, model and former beauty queen. She is considered one of the most successful actresses in Myanmar and one of the highest paid actresses. Throughout her career, she has acted in over 150 films.

Early life and education
Yu Thandar Tin was born on 6 March 1991 in Labutta, Ayeyarwady Region, Myanmar to parent Aung Naing, a trader and his wife Khin Nwe Yee. She is the eldest daughter of two siblings. She moved to Yangon from Labutta with her family in 2006. She attended high school at Basic Education High School No. 3 Dagon. She studied Civil engineering at West Yangon Technological University for two years and then switched to distance education at the Dagon University and graduated with a BA in English in 2015.

Career

2009–2010: Modeling and competed in the local pageants
Yu began her modeling career in 2009, was as a model as part of the John Lwin's John International Modeling Agency with countless modelling competition and runways that had been walked on. She also appeared on magazine cover photos and as commercial model for many advertisements.

In 2009, Yu competed in the Miss Lorkrathong 2009 pageant and became the 1st runner-up. The same year, she competed in the Miss Now How 2009 pageant, and won the Miss Now How popular award and became the 1st runner-up. She is also the winner of Miss Ngwe Saung 2010 and appointed as ambassador of Ngwesaung beach. Then came the offers for TV commercials and then DVD ones. Her hardwork as a model and acting in commercials was noticed by the film industry and soon, movie casting offers came rolling in.

2011–2013: Film debut and recognition
Yu made her film debut with a leading role in the film Nhait War Ta Ni (Two yellow One red) with Lu Min in 2011. She then starred in film Yet Lal, where she played the leading role with Lu Min and Ei Chaw Po in 2013. The film was both a domestic hit, and led to increased recognition for her.

2014–present: Breaking into the big screen and success
In 2014, she took on her first big-screen role in the film Aung Myin Kyaw Kyar Suesha Htet Myat, alongside Nay Toe, Ei Chaw Po, Shwe Hmone Yati and Chan Mi Mi Ko, directed by Nyi Nyi Tun Lwin, which screened in Myanmar cinemas in 2015.

In 2016, she starred in the comedy film Facebook Ywar (Facebook Village), alongside Lu Min, Khine Thin Kyi and Hsu Eaint San, directed by Yazawin Ko which premiered in Myanmar cinemas in 2016. In 2017, she was cast in the film Facebook Ywar 2 (Facebook village 2).

In 2019, she starred in the comedy-horror film Thaye Thinbaw (Ghost Ship), alongside Khant Si Thu, Thu Riya, Khine Thin Kyi and Hsu Eaint San, directed by Yarzawin Ko which premiered in Myanmar cinemas on 18 January 2019. The same year, she starred the female lead in the comedy-horror film Double Wedding, alongside Khant Si Thu and Shwe Hmone Yati, directed by Pyi Hein Thiha which screened in Myanmar cinemas on 5 August 2019. After this film, she starred in the comedy film Aung Twal Taw Sein Arr Thit, where she played the leading role with Arr Thit, Ye Aung, Khant Si Thu, Htun Eaindra Bo and Takathol Goon Pone, directed by Pyi Hein Thiha which screened in Myanmar cinemas on 25 July 2019 and processed huge hit and successes.

From 2011 to present, she has acted in over 150 video/films.

Brand ambassadorships
Yu is known as the face of many brands. Her first brand worked as the ambassador for Golden City Condominium residential. She worked with Golden City for a year from 2013 till the end of 2015. In 2015, she started working as Brand ambassador for G'Five smartphone.

Filmography

Film (Cinema)

 Aung Myin Kyaw Kyar Suesha Htet Myat (2015)
 Facebook Ywar (2016)
 Original Gangster 2 (2017)
 Thaye Thinbaw (Ghost Ship) (2019)
 Double Wedding (2019)
 Aung Twal Taw Sein Arr Thit (2019)

Film

(Over 100 films)
 Ma Ya Par (Wife's Relative) (2014)
 Kwine Pay (2014)
 Venus Race (2016)
 Ka Lain Razat Thu Daw (Beloved Bodyguard) (2012)

References

External links

1991 births
Living people
Burmese film actresses
Burmese female models
21st-century Burmese actresses
People from Ayeyarwady Region